The Municipality of Lendava is a municipality in the traditional region of Prekmurje in northeastern Slovenia. The seat of the municipality is the town of Lendava. Lendava became a municipality in 1994.

Settlements
In addition to the municipal seat of Lendava, the municipality also includes the following settlements:

 Banuta
 Benica
 Brezovec
 Čentiba
 Dolga Vas
 Dolgovaške Gorice
 Dolina pri Lendavi
 Dolnji Lakoš
 Gaberje
 Genterovci
 Gornji Lakoš
 Hotiza
 Kamovci
 Kapca
 Kot
 Lendavske Gorice
 Mostje
 Petišovci
 Pince
 Pince–Marof
 Radmožanci
 Trimlini

Demographics
The population by native language according to the 2002 census was:
Slovene:      5,516 (49.47%)
Hungarian:  4,390 (39.37%)
Other Europeans and unknown:       1,245 (11.16%)
Total:                             11,151

References

External links

Municipality of Lendava on Geopedia
Lendava municipal site

 
Lendava
1994 establishments in Slovenia